These are lists of battles fought in U.S. states by state in alphabetical order.
 List of battles fought in Colorado
 List of battles fought in Illinois
 List of battles fought in Indiana
 List of battles fought in Kansas
 List of battles fought in Kentucky
 List of battles fought in Missouri
 List of battles fought in Montana
 List of battles fought in Nebraska
 List of battles fought in New Mexico
 List of battles fought in North Dakota
 List of battles fought in Ohio
 List of battles fought in Oklahoma
 List of battles fought in South Dakota

See also 
 Battles in locations now part of the territory of the United States by war:
 List of American Revolutionary War battles
 List of American Civil War battles
 Conflicts (broadly defined) in locations now part of the territory of the United States:
 List of conflicts in British America (until 1783)
 List of conflicts in the United States (after 1783)
 List of conflicts in Hawaii (11th century – present)
 Armed conflicts, battles and wars with the United States as a participant:
 List of armed conflicts involving the United States
 List of battles with most United States military fatalities
 List of wars involving the United States

U.S.